Kuszholia (meaning "Milky Way bird" after the Kazakh term for the Milky Way, kus zholi) is the name given to a genus of primitive birds or bird-like dinosaurs from the Late Cretaceous. They were possibly coelurosaurs close to the ancestry of birds, although most scientists have considered it an avialan (either a primitive ornithuran or enantiornithine). Fossils were found in the Bissekty Formation in the Kyzyl Kum desert of Uzbekistan.

The genus contains a single species, K. mengi; a separate family has been erected for it (Kuszholiidae). It is known only from a series of small vertebrae, with prominent hollow chambers (pneumaticity).

References

External links
 George Olshevsky on Kuszholia, from the Dinosaur Mailing List

Bissekty Formation
Euenantiornitheans
Fossils of Uzbekistan
Fossil taxa described in 1992
Late Cretaceous birds of Asia
Prehistoric bird genera
Turonian life